Ben Shemen Youth Village (Kfar HaNo'ar Ben Shemen) is a youth village and agricultural boarding school in central Israel. Located near Ben Shemen and Ginaton, it falls under the jurisdiction of Hevel Modi'in Regional Council.

History

The village was established in 1927 on the land of the Hadid factory by Siegfried Lehman. Its aim was to endow children with a Zionist ethic, teach them to work the land, and install an appreciation of responsibility. The school's first students were from Kaunas in Lithuania.

In 1947, it had a population of roughly 1,000. During the 1948 Arab–Israeli War, the isolated village was under siege by the Arab Legion; eleven youths were killed in one attempt to bring in supplies.

Notable graduates include Shimon Peres, Shulamit Aloni, Moshe Katsav, Dan Ben Amotz, Ze'ev Gur-Arie (Wolfgang Lotz), Micha Tomkiewicz, Amitai Etzioni, and Haim Saban. Today, it has around 1,000 students, of which 400 live in the village.

References

External links
Official website

Youth villages in Israel
Populated places established in 1927
Jewish villages in Mandatory Palestine
Populated places in Central District (Israel)
1927 establishments in Mandatory Palestine
Lithuanian-Jewish culture in Israel